Ophiuchus Butterfly is an album by jazz guitarist Liberty Ellman, which was recorded in 2005 and released on Pi Recordings. He leads a sextet with Steve Lehman on alto sax, Mark Shim on tenor sax, Jose Davila on tuba, Stephan Crump on bass and Gerald Cleaver on drums.

Reception

In his review for AllMusic, Scott Yanow states "This music will take a bit of patience but it is worth the time for Ellman's music is quite original and subtle."

The All About Jazz review by Mark F. Turner notes "The creative and exhilarating Ophiuchus Butterfly finds Ellman digging deeper into eccentric and progressive territories with a sextet of like-minded artists with distinct voices."

In a review for PopMatters, Will Layman says "Ophiuchus Butterfly is reserved in its solo statements, but exuberant in its rhythms and construction."

The JazzTimes review by Aaron Steinberg states "Ellman still likes his funk and bop, but he’s now thinking in bigger structures, more complicated voicings and in textures."

Track listing
All Compositions by Liberty Ellman
 "Ophiuchus Butterfly" – 6:33
 "Aestivation" – 6:56 
 "Snow Lips" – 4:09
 "You Have Ears" – 6:35
 "The Naturalists" – 1:51
 "Pretty Words, Like Blades" – 4:34
 "Tarmacadam" – 7:08
 "Looking Up" – 7:58
 "Chromos" – 8:48
 "Borealis" – 3:05

Personnel
 Liberty Ellman – guitar, synthesizer, sampler
 Steve Lehman – alto saxophone
 Mark Shim – tenor saxophone
 Jose Davila – tuba 
 Stephan Crump – acoustic bass
 Gerald Cleaver – drums

References

2006 albums
Liberty Ellman albums
Pi Recordings albums